Sultanbekovo (Soltanbäk) is a rural locality (a village) in Taymurzinsky Selsoviet, Dyurtyulinsky District, Bashkortostan, Russia. The population was 182 as of 2010. There are 2 streets.

Geography 
Sultanbekovo is located 11 km southwest of Dyurtyuli (the district's administrative centre) by road. Taymurzino is the nearest rural locality.

References 

Rural localities in Dyurtyulinsky District